David Humke (born October 23, 1948) is an American politician who served in the Nevada Assembly from the 26th district from 1983 to 2002.

References

1948 births
Living people
Republican Party members of the Nevada Assembly